Mike Maccagnan is a former American football executive. He served as general manager for the New York Jets of the National Football League (NFL) from 2015 to 2019. He was notable for drafting Christian Hackenberg (considered an all-time draft bust) and having one of the worst draft records past the first round on of any general manager during this time period.

Early life 
He graduated from Trinity College in Hartford, Connecticut with a bachelor's degree in economics. Before that, he attended the Peddie School in Hightstown, NJ. He then attended Trinity-Pawling School in Pawling, NY for his postgraduate year. Maccagnan played lacrosse and football in high school and also for Trinity College.

Career
He joined the Washington Redskins scouting department as an intern during the team's training camp in 1990. He joined the front-office of the newly-founded World League of American Football as a league scout before becoming the director of player personnel for the London Monarchs in 1991.

He spent one and a half seasons in the Canadian Football League (CFL) as a director of scouting and player personnel for the Ottawa Rough Riders and Saskatchewan Roughriders from 1993 to 1994.

Maccagnan was reunited with the Washington Redskins as a scout from 1995 to 2000. He then joined the Houston Texans shortly after Charley Casserly's appointment as general manager. He spent 15 years with the organization, starting as a coordinator of college scouting, rising in 2011 to Director of College Scouting.

Maccagnan was hired as the general manager of the New York Jets on January 13, 2015. Shortly following his hiring, Arizona Cardinals defensive coordinator Todd Bowles was hired as the new head coach. On December 29, 2017 it was announced he had signed a contract extension through 2020. He was fired by the Jets on May 15, 2019, and was replaced by Joe Douglas in June.

References

Year of birth missing (living people)
Living people
Houston Texans scouts
National Football League general managers
New York Jets executives
Peddie School alumni
Players of American football from New Jersey
Sportspeople from Mercer County, New Jersey
Trinity Bantams football players
Washington Redskins scouts
People from Hightstown, New Jersey